NAD+ pyrophosphorylase may refer to:

 Nicotinate-nucleotide diphosphorylase (carboxylating)
 Nicotinamide-nucleotide adenylyltransferase